The 2004–05 Boston College Eagles men's basketball team played college basketball for the Boston College Eagles as a member of the Big East Conference during the 2004–05 NCAA Division I men's basketball season. Led by head coach Al Skinner, the team played their home games at the Conte Forum in Chestnut Hill, Massachusetts. After finishing tied atop the conference regular season standings, the Eagles lost in the quarterfinals of the Big East Tournament to West Virginia. The team received an at-large bid to the NCAA tournament as the No. 4 seed in the Chicago region. BC defeated  in the opening round before being upset by No. 12 seed UW-Milwaukee 83–75. The team finished with an overall record of 25–5 (13–3 Big East).

Roster

Schedule and results

|-
!colspan=9 style=| Regular Season

|-
!colspan=9 style=| Big East Tournament

|-
!colspan=9 style=| NCAA Tournament

Rankings

References

Boston College Eagles men's basketball seasons
Boston College
Boston College
Boston College Eagles men's basketball
Boston College Eagles men's basketball
Boston College Eagles men's basketball
Boston College Eagles men's basketball